Pseudaoria is a genus of leaf beetles in the subfamily Eumolpinae. It is distributed in East and Southeast Asia. The genus was first established by Martin Jacoby, in a volume of The Fauna of British India posthumously published in 1908, for two newly described species from Manipur and Burma. Pseudaoria is similar to the genus Aoria. In a review of the latter genus in 2012, L.N. Medvedev included Pseudaoria as a subgenus of it.

Species
 Pseudaoria burmanica Jacoby, 1908
 Pseudaoria coerulea Jacoby, 1908
 Pseudaoria floccosa Tan, 1992
 Pseudaoria irregularis Tan, 1992
 Pseudaoria petri Warchałowski, 2010
 Pseudaoria rufina Gressitt & Kimoto, 1961
 Pseudaoria yunnanna Tan, 1992

References

Eumolpinae
Chrysomelidae genera
Beetles of Asia
Taxa named by Martin Jacoby